Otmar Issing (born 27 March 1936 in Würzburg) is a German economist who served as a member of the Executive Board of the European Central Bank from 1998 to 2006 and concurrently as ECB chief economist. He developed the 'two-pillar' approach to monetary policy decision-making that the ECB has adopted. After leaving the Executive Board, Issing been serving as president of the Center for Financial Studies since 2006.

Life 

Issing studied economics at the University of Würzburg from 1955 until 1960 with temporary studies in London and Paris. From 1960 to 1966 he worked as a research assistant at the University of Würzburg. He earned his PhD in 1961 and received his postdoctoral lecture qualification (habilitation) in 1965.
In 1967 Issing became director of the Institute for International Economic Relations at the University of Erlangen-Nuremberg and full professor at the faculty of economics and social sciences of the University of Erlangen-Nuremberg. In 1973 he was appointed Professor of Economics, Monetary Affairs and International Economic Relations at the University of Würzburg.

From 1988 to 1990 Issing was a member of the German Council of Economic Experts and in 1990 he became a member of the board of the Deutsche Bundesbank with a seat on the Central Bank Council. In 1998 Issing became a member of the executive board of the European Central Bank, responsible for the Directorates General Economics and Research as well as its first Chief Economist.

Since June 2006 Issing has been president of the Center for Financial Studies (CFS) at the Goethe University in Frankfurt am Main and from 2007 until 2018 he was an international advisor to Goldman Sachs.

In October 2008 Issing chaired a German government expert group on the new financial order that drew up proposals on how to reform international financial markets (also known as "Issing Commission"). The group published six reports. In 2008 Issing was also a member of the high level group of the European Commission on financial supervision in the EU chaired by Jacques de Larosière. He was a Member of the G20 Eminent Persons Group on Global Financial Governance, which was formally established by G20 Finance Ministers and Central Bank Governors for the period 2017-2018.

Memberships 
Verein für Socialpolitik (German Economic Association), American Economic Association, Akademie der Wissenschaften und der Literatur (Academy of Sciences and Literature, as a Corresponding Member from 1989-1991), Academia Scientiarum et Artium Europaea, Walter Eucken Institute, Executive Committee of the Institute for European Affairs (INEA), Euro50 Group, Advisory Board of the Globalization and Monetary Policy Institute (Federal Reserve Bank of Dallas, until 2016).

Publications 
Issing's scientific publications almost cover the whole range of recent economic policy issues. His two main research topics are monetary theory and policy and international economic relations.

His most recent books are:

 "Der Euro in stürmischen Zeiten" about economic and monetary policy at Center for Financial Studies 2006-2015 (Vahlen, 2016) 
 "Einführung in die Geldtheorie" (Introduction to Monetary Theory), fifteenth edition, Munich 2011. (Translations into Chinese and Bulgarian)
 "Der Euro. Geburt - Erfolg - Zukunft" about the creation of the new European currency published by Franz Vahlen in 2008., English version: "The birth of the Euro" (Cambridge, 2008), Chinese version 2010
 "Imperfect knowledge and monetary policy", with Vitor Gaspar, Oreste Tristani and David Vestin (Cambridge, 2005)
 "Monetary policy in the Euro Area", with Vitor Gaspar, Ignazio Angeloni and Oreste Tristani (Cambridge, 2001)
 "Von der D-Mark zum Euro" (Tübingen, 1998)
 "Einführung in die Geldpolitik" (6th edition, Munich, 1996)

Positions 
Issing was critical on the premature start of European Monetary Union with a large group of heterogenous countries. He warned EU member states not to violate the no-bailout clause that prohibits the assumption of liability for other countries’ debts.

In October 2016 Issing warned that the Stability and Growth Pact was near to failure, there was no market discipline because of ECB interventions and no fiscal control mechanism from markets or politicians. The ECB had "crossed the Rubicon" and was in an untenable position, struggling to carry out its conflicting roles as agent of monetary policy, banking regulator, and Troika enforcer. Noting that the bank already held over €1 trillion of bonds bought at artificially low or negative yields, so would face great losses when interest rates rise again, he warned. The reputational risk of such actions by a central bank would have been unthinkable in the past." His conclusion was that in its current form the euro project was unworkable and one day would collapse.

Other activities

Corporate boards
 Deloitte Germany, Member of the Advisory Board
 Goldman Sachs, Member of the International Advisory Council (since 2006)

Non-profit organizations
 Berggruen Institute, Member of the Council for the Future of Europe
 European Academy of Sciences and Arts, Member
 Friedrich August von Hayek Foundation, Member of the Board of Trustees
 Gesellschaft für Kapitalmarktforschung, Chairman of the Board of Trustees
 House of Finance at Goethe University Frankfurt, Chairman of the Board of Trustees 
 International Finance, Member of the Editorial Board
 Leibniz Institute for Financial Research, Member of the Board of Trustees
 Bocconi University, Member of the International Advisory Council (until 2015)

Recognition

Awards
1993 – Verdienstkreuz 1. Klasse des Verdienstordens der Bundesrepublik Deutschland
2003 – International Prize of the Friedrich-August-von-Hayek-Foundation 
2004 – Bernhard-Harms Medal, Institute for World Economics, Kiel
2005 – Hans-Möller Medal for special merits in economics
2006 – Großes Verdienstkreuz des Verdienstordens der Bundesrepublik Deutschland
2006 – Ludwig-Erhard-Preis für Wirtschaftspublizistik
2006 – Grand Officier de l’Ordre de Mérite du Grand-Duché de Luxembourg
2007 – Silver Insignia of Würzburg
2011 – Gustav-Stolper Award of the Verein für Socialpolitik

Honorary degrees
1991 – Honorary professorship at the University of Würzburg
1996 – Honorary doctorate awarded by the Faculty of Law and Economic Sciences of the University of Bayreuth
1998 – Honorary doctorate awarded by the Faculty of Economic Sciences and Statistics of the University of Constance
1999 – Honorary doctorate awarded by the Faculty of Economic Sciences of the Goethe University Frankfurt
2007 – Honorary Professor Goethe University Frankfurt
2010 – Laurea Honoris Causa in International Economic Integration by the Faculty of Economic Sciences of the University of Pavia
2016 – Honorary Senator of the University of Würzburg

References

External links 
 Issing’s Homepage at the Center for Financial Studies

|-

1936 births
Commanders Crosses of the Order of Merit of the Federal Republic of Germany
German economists
Goldman Sachs people
Living people
Members of the European Academy of Sciences and Arts
Academic staff of the University of Würzburg
Academic staff of the University of Erlangen-Nuremberg
Executive Board of the European Central Bank members